Augustus Russell Pope (November 29, 1898 – 1953) was an American athlete. He  won the bronze medal in the discus throw at the 1920 Summer Olympics and finished fourth in 1924.

In June 1921, Pope was the individual points leader with 10 points at the first NCAA track and field championships; Pope competed for the University of Washington and won both the shot put and the discus events at the 1921 NCAA championships. The same year he was ranked as world's best discus thrower. Pope also played American football for the Huskies in 1919–20.

References

1898 births
1953 deaths
American male discus throwers
Athletes (track and field) at the 1920 Summer Olympics
Athletes (track and field) at the 1924 Summer Olympics
Medalists at the 1920 Summer Olympics
Olympic bronze medalists for the United States in track and field
Washington Huskies football players
Washington Huskies men's track and field athletes
Players of American football from Seattle
Track and field athletes from Seattle